Rhamnus bourgaeana is an unresolved species of woody flowering plant in the buckthorn family Rhamnaceae.

References

bourgaena